Frank Olsson (3 November 1922 – 26 April 2010) was a Swedish rower. He competed in the men's eight event at the 1952 Summer Olympics.

References

External links
 

1922 births
2010 deaths
Swedish male rowers
Olympic rowers of Sweden
Rowers at the 1952 Summer Olympics
People from Strömstad Municipality
Sportspeople from Västra Götaland County